is a Japanese former professional tennis player. She was born on February 6, 1971, in Hiroshima and resides in Fukuyama, Hiroshima.

She started playing tennis at age seven with her father and coach Hiroshi and played on the WTA Tour from 1991 until 1998. She graduated from the University of Tsukuba while on the tour in March 1993.

Career highlights
 Her career-high ranking was 26th worldwide in singles (1994), and 98th in doubles (1995)
 She played 22 Grand Slam tournaments in singles with her best result being the round of 16 at the 1994 US Open. That tournament marked the first time two Japanese women reached the fourth round of a Grand Slam (Kimiko Date was the other player).
 Her career record is 144–108. She won a singles title in Hobart in 1994, defeating Lindsay Davenport during that tournament.
 Her biggest upset over a seeded player came at the 1996 Australian Open when she defeated the fifth seed Kimiko Date in the second round.

WTA career finals

Singles: 2 (1 title, 1 runner-up)

ITF finals

Singles (4–0)

Doubles (0–3)

External links
 
 
 

Living people
1971 births
University of Tsukuba alumni
Japanese female tennis players
Olympic tennis players of Japan
People from Fukuyama, Hiroshima
Sportspeople from Hiroshima
Sportspeople from Hiroshima Prefecture
Tennis players at the 1992 Summer Olympics
Asian Games medalists in tennis
Tennis players at the 1994 Asian Games
Universiade medalists in tennis
Medalists at the 1994 Asian Games
Asian Games gold medalists for Japan
Asian Games bronze medalists for Japan
Universiade gold medalists for Japan
Medalists at the 1991 Summer Universiade
Medalists at the 1993 Summer Universiade
20th-century Japanese women
21st-century Japanese women